The WFTDA South Central Regional Tournament or WFTDA South Central Region Playoffs was one of four annual roller derby regional qualifying tournaments for the WFTDA Championships.

The Tournament was organised by the Women's Flat Track Derby Association (WFTDA). Full WFTDA members in the South Central Region were eligible for ranking, and the top ten leagues would qualify for the South Central Regional Tournament, with the top three finalists qualifying for the Championships. Together, the four qualifying tournaments and Championships were termed the "Big 5". Starting with the 2013 WFTDA season, WFTDA's regions were discontinued in favor of an overall-rankings based system, and a new playoff format was created.

Championships

2009 Southern Fried Smackdown
On September 27, 2009, the Texas Rollergirls (Texecutioners) beat the Kansas City Roller Warriors 153-70 in the South Central championship bout. Houston Roller Derby (HaRD Knocks) defeated the Dallas Derby Devils 113-101 to take third place.

References

Recurring sporting events established in 2009
South Central Region (WFTDA)
Roller derby competitions
Women's Flat Track Derby Association